Rubble Creek is a creek in southwestern British Columbia, Canada. It flows northwest from Garibaldi Lake into the Cheakamus River near the abandoned settlement of Garibaldi.

References

Rivers of the Pacific Ranges
New Westminster Land District